Samuel Adebayo Abe was the Anglican Bishop of Ekiti in 2007, in Ondo Province of the Church of Nigeria.

Abe retired in 2012 as the  Bishop of Ekiti and Archbishop of Ondo Province; he was succeeded as Bishop of Ekiti  by Chris Omotunde, and by George Olatunji Lasebikan as Archbishop of Ondo.

He was consecrated Bishop of Ekiti in 1998, upon the retirement of Samuel Akinbola. He was re-elected for a second term as Archbishop of Ondo in 2007.

References

Living people
Anglican bishops of Ekiti
Anglican archbishops of Ondo
21st-century Anglican bishops in Nigeria
Nigerian Anglicans
Year of birth missing (living people)